Bojan Jamina (5 February 1979 – 26 December 2022) was a Bosnian professional footballer who played as a midfielder.

Club career
Of Bosnian Serb ancestry, Jamina was born in Sarajevo, SR Bosnia and Herzegovina, at the time still part of former Yugoslavia.  Besides FK Slavija, where he spent most of his career, he has also played with Bosnian clubs FK Željezničar Sarajevo, FK Kozara Gradiška and NK Čelik Zenica, and also in Serbia, first with FK Zvezdara from where he left in 1998, and then OFK Beograd, and Slovenia NK Olimpija Ljubljana and ND Triglav Kranj.

References

1979 births
2022 deaths
Footballers from Sarajevo
Serbs of Bosnia and Herzegovina
Association football midfielders
Bosnia and Herzegovina footballers
Bosnia and Herzegovina under-21 international footballers
FK Željezničar Sarajevo players
FK Zvezdara players
FK Slavija Sarajevo players
OFK Beograd players
NK Olimpija Ljubljana (1945–2005) players
NK Triglav Kranj players
FK Kozara Gradiška players
NK Čelik Zenica players
FK Famos Vojkovići players
Slovenian PrvaLiga players
Premier League of Bosnia and Herzegovina players
First League of the Republika Srpska players
Bosnia and Herzegovina expatriate footballers
Expatriate footballers in Serbia and Montenegro
Bosnia and Herzegovina expatriate sportspeople in Serbia and Montenegro
Expatriate footballers in Slovenia
Bosnia and Herzegovina expatriate sportspeople in Slovenia